Antonio Martos (born 27 November 1946) is a Spanish racing cyclist. He rode in the 1971 Tour de France.

References

External links
 

1946 births
Living people
Spanish male cyclists
Place of birth missing (living people)
People from Vega del Guadalquivir
Sportspeople from the Province of Seville
Cyclists from Andalusia